Chad-e Bala (also Romanized as Chād-e Bālā; also known as Chad-e Borzī) is a village in Birk Rural District, in the Central District of Mehrestan County, Sistan and Baluchestan Province, Iran. At the 2006 census, its population was 396, in 80 families.

References 

Populated places in Mehrestan County